This article describes all the 2019 seasons of Formula Renault series across the world.

Regional Formula 3

2019 Formula Renault Eurocup season

Formula Renault 2.0L

2019 Asian Formula Renault Series season

Unofficial Formula Renault championships

2019 Ultimate Cup Series Monoplace season
The season was held between 23 March and 3 November, predominantly based in France but also racing across Europe in Tatuus FR 2.0 chassis.  Gentleman Drivers are indicated in blue.

2019 Drexler-Automotive Formula Renault 2.0 Pokal season

The season was held between 5th April and 13 October, and raced across Austria, Italy, Czech Republic and Germany. The races occur with other categories cars as part of the 2019 Austria Formula 3 Cup, this section presents only the Austrian Formula Renault 2.0L classification.

2019 Formula Nordic season

2019 Formula Renault 2.0 Argentina season
All cars use Tito 02 chassis, all races were held in Argentina.

1 extra point in each race for regularly qualified drivers.

FIA Formula 4 powered by Renault

2019 French F4 Championship season

2019 F4 Danish Championship

2019 Formula 4 South East Asia Championship

References 

Renault
Formula Renault seasons